Janko Tipsarević, the last year's champion, did not defend his title.
Adrian Mannarino defeated Steve Darcis 7–5, 6–2 in this year's final.

Seeds

Draw

Finals

Top half

Bottom half

References
 Main Draw
 Qualifying Draw

Ethias Trophy - Singles
2010 Ethias Trophy